The Kaimingjie germ weapon attack was a Japanese biological warfare bacterial germ strike against Kaimingjie, an area of the port of Ningbo in the Chinese province of Zhejiang in October 1940, during the Second Sino-Japanese War.

These attacks were a joint Unit 731 and Unit 1644 endeavour. Bubonic plague was the area of greatest interest to the doctors of the units mentioned above. Six different plague attacks were conducted in China during the war, between the start of aggression and the end of the war.

Using airdropped wheat, corn, scraps of cotton cloth and sand infested with plague infected fleas, an outbreak was started that resulted in a hundred deaths, infections and mild to severe bodily mutilations. The area was evacuated and a  wall was built around it to enforce a quarantine. The area was eventually burnt to the ground to eradicate the disease.

A later attack in 1942 on the same area by the two units led to the development of their final delivery system: airdropped ceramic bombs. Some work was conducted during the war with the use of liquid forms of the pathogen agents but the results were unsatisfactory for the researchers.

The attacks were formed on the research of units 731 and 1644. These units researched the effects of various chemicals and pathogens that had the potential to be used as biological weapons on soldiers and civilians. The aim of the development of these biological weapons was the use of the weapons to further expand the Japanese empire across Asia.

These units were arms of the Japanese top-secret biological weapons program. The program was headed by general Shirō Ishii. General Ishii devised the plans for the Kaimingjie germ weapon attack and played a major role in the Japanese biological weapons program, specifically through securing the program's funding.

Background 

The Kaimingjie germ weapon attack occurred during the Second Sino-Japanese war (1937–45). This was a military conflict between the Republic of China and the Empire of Japan. The war broke out as a resistance to the Japanese expansion and influence on Chinese territory.

In 1931 Japan's Kwantung army occupied Manchuria in an event known as the Mukden incident. Manchuria consisted of China's three north-eastern provinces. Before 1937 China and Japan fought in localised engagements but refrained from fighting a major war. In Manchuria, Japan established the puppet state of Manchukuo, which became a colony of Japan. Japan then continued to expand its occupation of China. These activities created a growing resistance against Japanese expansion. The Marco Polo Bridge Incident of 1937 marked the beginning of full-scale hostilities between the Republic of China and the Empire of Japan.

Japan's occupation of China was declared illegal by the League of Nations; however, it was not able to pass sanctions to cease the occupation as Japan had withdrawn from the league in 1933. In China, the Second Sino-Japanese war is known as the “war of resistance”.

Research of the weapon 
Japan had signed the Geneva Protocol, which prohibited biological and chemical warfare, but it had not ratified the treaty and was thus not bound to the conditions of the treaty. Not being bound to the protocol therefore allowed Japan to develop a chemical and biological weapons program.

This program, under Japan's top-secret weapons program, was founded and led by General Shirō Ishii.

Ishii played a large role in pushing for the funding of the biological weapons program from the high command. General Ishii was said to have been an “eccentric ... flamboyant and arrogant man”. Ishii was accepted into the medical department of Kyoto Imperial University, where he demonstrated his fast and quick mind, much advanced for his age. Throughout university, Japan instilled a solid sense of nationalism and patriotic duty into the students. General Shirō Ishii has been described as an "ardent ultra-nationalist".

Ishii understood science and medicine as an avenue to further Japan's nationalistic goals. He joined the army where he was appointed lieutenant. Along his journey, Ishii created a network of ties with people of high standing in university and the military; these connections would later facilitate the founding of the biological weapons program, and subsequent research. His argument for the use of chemical weapons was that biological warfare would be a cheaper alternative to traditional forms of weaponry.

The main units of this program were units 731 and 1644. Both units operated under the guise of the Epidemic Prevention and Water Purification Department in the Imperial Japanese Army, and had the public mission of preventing the spread of disease through monitoring Japan's water supply.

Much of the research and experimentation took place in China and Manchukuo, although some experimentation also occurred at Imperial Navy hospitals and hospitals where wounded soldiers were being treated for their injuries. Experimentation occurred at these hospitals on islands across the Pacific wherein various prisoners of war from different countries were used as subjects for the experiments, including Soviet and Chinese prisoners.

Unit 731 

The plan for the Kaimingjie germ weapon attack was devised by General Shirō Ishii within Unit 731, which worked on development of biological and chemical weapons. This unit was tasked with performing experiments into chemical agents that had the potential to be used and developed into biological weapons. The unit conducted experiments with infectious diseases in which researchers subjected Chinese captives and captured insurgents to cholera, syphilis, and bubonic plague. Additionally, the unit performed vivisection on their human subjects after they were infected with these various diseases. Invasive surgeries were performed on humans where individual organs would be removed from live subjects and studied to understand the effects of diseases.

Unit 731 also studied the effects of various toxins. Specific experiments conducted included testing poison gas on prisoners, testing bubonic plague bombs, and testing frostbite and its remedies on live people. Additionally this unit studied malnutrition, tetanus, anthrax, dysentery, glanders and more.

Most of these experiments were carried out in a facility called Ping Fan in Harbin, Manchukuo. Ping Fan was an important site for the study of frostbite, wherein living people’s limbs were frozen and then thawed out.

Those who were conducting experiments did not employ anaesthesia and left their subjects fully awake whilst they were being operated on, as claimed by Japanese army doctor Yasua Ken.

It has also been alleged that British and American prisoners of war were subject to biological weapons experimentation at a detention camp near Mukden, though in 1986 the British Ministry of Defence denied any evidence of these events.

Unit 731 was involved in production and delivery of poison gases, and in 1929, a factory on Okunoshima was established to produce various poisonous gases such as mustard gas and phosphene gas. These gases were then transported to the city of Kokura and packaged into artillery shells to be used on Chinese combatants and civilians. It is alleged that the gases were used on these groups over 2000 times.

Unit 731 bred yellow rats and fleas in order to spread pathogens. This took place mainly at Ping Fan. Rats would be infected with the plague, and fleas would be raised on the blood of these infected rats.

Pathogen infected fleas would be encased in a weapon called the Uji bomb, a ceramic bomb designed to explode hundreds of feet above ground and shower infected fleas over Chinese cities. Initially the Uji bomb was made of a steel casing but this proved inadequate as very few pathogens survived the heat generated by the initial explosion, therefore General Ishii modified the bomb to use a ceramic casing in place of the steel frame. These new Uji bombs were tested in Ping Fan airfields on human subjects, and were used to infect large areas with various pathogens.

Unit 1644 

Japanese military unit 1644 was headed by Masuda Tomosada, who was appointed by General Shiro Ishii. Unit 1644 was established in 1939 in Japanese-occupied Nanking. The unit operated under the guise of the Epidemic Prevention and Water Purification Department, and its main function was the mass production of bacteria to be used for attacks; it also conducted experiments with various biological agents. Unit 1644 focused mainly on carrying out experiments with cholera, typhus, and bubonic plague.

The unit also experimented with various poisons extracted from animals, such as Taiwanese snake poisons from the cobra, hadi, and amagasa snakes.

Unit 1644 was relatively small when compared with other units in the Japanese biological weapons program, but received large amounts of funding despite its relatively small size.

Impact of the attack 
The Kaimingjie germ weapon attack consisted of corn and cloth infested with fleas. These fleas, infected with cholera and the bubonic plague, were airdropped over the area of Ningbo on October 27, 1940. Rats would be infected with these fleas; the fleas would then move on and find human hosts.

On October 29 the first three cases of the plague were diagnosed by local health officials in Kaimingjie. An estimated 26 deaths had occurred by November 2. In response to the situation, quarantines were imposed on affected areas and homes were routinely disinfected. Sheets and cloths were burnt as a precautionary measure and vaccinations were soon introduced by officials. The areas of the city most affected by the attack were evacuated and later burnt to prevent further outbreaks and completely eradicate the disease. One victim, Jiand Chun Geng, suffered flesh-eating ulcers. Others suffered untreated infections that led to death.

There were also many casualties leading up to this attack. In particular, Unit 731's experiments saw many victims. Dr. Sheldon Harris estimated that from testing of prototype weapons, 250,000 civilians died.

There was a second Japanese attack on Kaimingjie that occurred in 1942, this germ weapon attack consisted of airdropping ceramic bombs over the city.

The aftermath of the attack and the war 
Japan surrendered to American Allies on September 2, 1945. The United States planned to prosecute Japanese war criminals in both “major tribunals and minor trials”, as stated by General Douglas MacArthur. Very little was known about Japan's biological weapons until 1944, when breakthroughs in decoding Japanese communications had been made by American intelligence.

However, those who led Unit 731 were not put on trial; though information had surfaced on the Japanese biological weapons program, it was not connected to Unit 731. This was potentially an official cover-up, attributed to the perceived military value seen by the USA in the information that Unit 731 held, such as the effects of biological agents on humans. The USA itself had researched biological and chemical weapons, specifically through the US Army Chemical Corps.

The failure to prosecute those involved in biological warfare may also have been due to lack of due diligence in the investigative process.

It has been speculated that the USA helped with the cover-up of a factory in Okunoshima that produced mustard gas and phosphene gas. During this coverup, thousands of tons of poison gases were allegedly dumped into the ocean in 1946. General Shirō Ishii provided the Americans with documents revealing secrets of the Japanese warfare program. General Ishii was not prosecuted for his activities.

The Soviet Union captured some Unit 731 personnel whilst they were fleeing from Manchukuo. Some of these captured men stood trial in the Khabarovsk War Crime Trials held between 25-31 of December 1949 in the Soviet Union. During these trials, twelve Japanese medical army researchers were convicted of war crimes. Japanese Major General Yoshiyuki Kawashima testified that Unit 731 had dropped plague-contaminated fleas on Chinese cities that had caused epidemic plague outbreaks. However, these trials were labelled as propaganda by the United States. It has been said that the trials do not offer enough independent verification on the subject and certain crucial points.

Many of the leaders in Japan's secret biological warfare program went on to have successful careers in the USA. Many of the activities undertaken by the Japanese army are omitted from historical textbooks and Western culture.

Historiography 
Compared to other histories, the topic of the Japanese biological weapons program is relatively understudied. This is due to the lack of documents and writings available on the topic. Much of the information important to the topic was destroyed, lost and largely covered up. Much of the information held by the United States had been kept classified until recent times.

The first notable non-governmental inquiry into the topic was conducted by journalists Peter Williams and David Wallace. They brought to light the experimentation and attacks committed by Japanese Unit 731 and the plans devised by general Shirō Ishii. They also spoke of alleged coverup of the Japanese war crimes. The works of these men brought exposure to the western world.

Historian Sheldon Harris later furthered this work and brought even more exposure onto the subject, with in-depth rigour and evaluation of the subject. Harris collected research from people who had direct knowledge and experience with the events. Additionally, he brought to light the different units involved in the biological weapons program such as Units 731, 1644, 100 and more.

See also 
 Japanese war crimes

References

Japanese war crimes
1940 in Japan
1940 in China
Biological warfare
Japanese biological weapons program